Taoyuan Main Public Library is the central library of Taoyuan, Taiwan. It is located on Nanping Road, Taoyuan District, and it is a part of Taoyuan Zhongzheng Arts and Cultural Business District. The main library was estimated to be completed by the end of 2021, and it began trial operation on December 17th, 2022. It is the largest local public library and the fourth largest public library in Taiwan by total area, after National Central Library, National Taiwan Library and National Library of Public Information.

Architecture

Old Building
The former building of Taoyuan Main Public Library was located in the Department of Cultural Affairs building of Taoyuan City Government. It was opened in 1983, comprises 5 above-ground floors and one below. It was changed to "Taoyuan Public Library Department of Cultural Affairs Branch" after the opening of the new main library.

New Building

The new building of Taoyuan Main Public Library consists of two buildings above the ground, the library and the cinema,  which will be connected by a balcony on the second floor. The library comprises 8 above-ground floors and two below, in addition to the library, there are facilities such as cinemas, cultural and creative plazas, and theme restaurants. The design competition was held on April 12, 2017. The design concept of the "Tree of Life" is composed of five elements: "Eco Tube", "Knowledge Spiral", "Bookshelf Structure", "Green Spiral" and "Eco Skin".

Floor Plan 

Taoyuan Main Public Library

References

External links

Official Website 
Design concept video of new Taoyuan Main Public Library, provided by T.C.K. Architect Engineer Planner and Azusa Sekkei (Youtube link)

Public libraries in Taiwan
1983 establishments in Taiwan
2022 establishments in Taiwan
Libraries in Taoyuan City
Taoyuan District